The Duden is a dictionary of the German language.

Duden may also refer to:

Duden (surname)
"Duden" (song), a song by Natacha Atlas
Duden Park, a park in Brussels, Belgium
26119 Duden, a main-belt asteroid
Düden River of Anatolia, Turkey
Düden Waterfalls formed by the Düden River